Odites cuculans is a moth in the family Depressariidae. It was described by Edward Meyrick in 1918. It is found in Mozambique and the Republic of the Congo.

The wingspan is 15–19 mm. The forewings are whitish yellowish with the costal edge sometimes slightly brownish tinged anteriorly. There is a blackish dot towards the costa in the middle, and one on the lower angle of the cell. The hindwings are whitish ochreous.

References

Moths described in 1918
Odites
Taxa named by Edward Meyrick
Moths of Sub-Saharan Africa